Alfred Ekow Gyan was a Ghanaian politician and member of Parliament for the Takoradi constituency in the Western Region of Ghana. He was a member of the National Democratic Congress of Ghana.

He died on September 1 2021 after a short illness.

References

1964 births
2021 deaths
People from Western Region (Ghana)
National Democratic Congress (Ghana) politicians
Ghana Secondary Technical School alumni